Chikkaharakuni is a village in Dharwad district of Karnataka, India.

Demographics
As of the 2011 Census of India there were 95 households in Chikkaharakuni and a total population of 438 consisting of 222 males and 216 females. There were 64 children ages 0-6.

References

Villages in Dharwad district